Washington State University Press (or WSU Press) is a university press that is part of Washington State University. Initially established in the 1920s before being reorganized in the 1980s, the press has issued over 200 titles. The publisher also distributes titles released by Lost Horse Press.

See also

 List of English-language book publishing companies
 List of university presses

References

External links
Washington State University Press

Washington State University Press
University presses of the United States
Book publishing companies based in Washington (state)